Belonging is an album by American pianist Keith Jarrett which was released on the ECM label in 1974.  It is the first album by Jarrett's so-called 'European Quartet' featuring Jan Garbarek, Palle Danielsson and Jon Christensen. Because Jarrett's contract with ABC/Impulse! prevented him from performing with the quartet under his own name, the group became known as the "Belonging" quartet.

Jarrett was known for valuing spontaneity over technical perfection, and, according to producer Manfred Eicher, refused to record more than one take of the title piece, thus goading the musicians to a high level of concentration. Garbarek later recalled that he had never recorded a piece so quickly, and with such minimal rehearsal.

Reception 

AllMusic reviewer Richard S. Ginell awarded the album 4½ stars, stating, "The record operates at its strongest level when Jarrett locks the quartet into his winning gospel mode on "'Long as You Know You're Living Yours" and the tense drive of "Spiral Dance"; the reflective numbers are less compelling. Still, this LP-turned-CD successfully bucked the powerful electric trends of its time and holds up well today."

The authors of The Penguin Guide to Jazz awarded the album 4 stars, and wrote: "Belonging... is a superb album, characterized by some of the pianist's most open and joyous playing on record; his double-time solo on 'The Windup' is almost Tatum-like in its exuberance and fluency. The country-blues feel of 'Long as You Know You're Living Yours' is a confident reflection of his music roots. The ballads 'Blossom', 'Solstice' and the title-piece... are remarkable by any standards; Garbarek's slightly out-of-tune opening statement on 'Solstice' and Danielsson's subsequent solo are masterful, while Jarrett's own split chords accentuate the mystery and ambiguity of the piece."

Controversy and legal dispute 
The tune "Long as You Know You're Living Yours" was the subject of a lawsuit between Jarrett and jazz-rock group Steely Dan: Jarrett alleged that the duo's title track from their 1980 album Gaucho had stolen from the song. Co-writer Donald Fagen later admitted he'd loved the track and was strongly influenced by it. Jarrett sued for copyright infringement and was then added as a co-author of the song.

"Long as You Know You're Living Yours" serves as the theme song for CBC Radio's Writers and Company program.

Track listing 
All music composed by Keith Jarrett
 "Spiral Dance" – 4:11
 "Blossom" – 12:15
 "'Long as You Know You're Living Yours" – 6:14
 "Belonging" – 2:15
 "The Windup" – 8:27
 "Solstice" – 13:13

Personnel 
 Keith Jarrett – piano
 Jan Garbarek – tenor and soprano saxophones
 Palle Danielsson – bass
 Jon Christensen – drums

Production
 Manfred Eicher – production
 Jan Erik Kongshaug – recording engineer
 Tadayuki Naitoh – cover design and layout

References 

Keith Jarrett albums
Jan Garbarek albums
1974 albums
ECM Records albums
Albums produced by Manfred Eicher